The Symphony No. 3, Op. 35, is an orchestral composition by the Finnish composer Aulis Sallinen, who wrote the piece from 1974–75 on commission from the Finnish Broadcasting Company. The Finnish Radio Symphony Orchestra premiered the work on 8 April 1975 in Helsinki, under the direction of its principal conductor, Okko Kamu. The symphony was the first by Sallinen to depart from the single-movement structure he had utilized for his previous two essays in the form.

Instrumentation 
According to the publisher, Novello & Co, Symphony No. 3 is scored for the following:
Woodwind: 4 flutes (2 doubling piccolo), 3 oboes, 4 clarinets in B (1 doubling B bass clarinet), 3 bassoons (1 doubling contrabassoon)
Brass: 4 horns in F, 3 trumpets in B, 3 trombones, 1 tuba
Percussion: timpani, 3 percussionists (bass drum, snare drum, small drum, tom-toms, wood blocks, tam-tam, crotales, cymbals glockenspiel, vibraphone, marimba)
Strings: violins, violas, cellos, double basses, harp, celesta, piano

Structure 
The symphony is in three movements:

Recordings 
To date, Symphony No. 3 has received two recordings, the first of which is from 1975 with Okko Kamu conducting the Finnish Radio Symphony Orchestra on the BIS label. Finnish conductor Ari Rasilainen has also recorded the symphony as part of cpo's compendium of Sallinen's orchestral works. The Third Symphony joins the Fifth (Op. 57, 1985) on the penultimate volume of the cpo series.

Notes, references, and sources

Notes

References

Sources 

Books

CD liner notes

Journal articles
 
 

Symphonies by Aulis Sallinen
1975 compositions
Sallinen 3